Edward Bacon may refer to:

Edward Bacon (died 1618),  High Sheriff of Suffolk, British Member of Parliament for Great Yarmouth, Tavistock, Weymouth and Melcombe Regis, and Suffolk
Edward A. Bacon (1897–1968), American businessman and Republican politician
Edward Denny Bacon (1860–1938), British entrepreneur and philatelist
Edward Bacon (died 1786), British Member of Parliament for Callington, Newport, King's Lynn and Norwich
Edward Woolsey Bacon (1843–1887), American sailor and clergyman
Edward R. Bacon (1848–1915), American railroad executive, lawyer and financier

See also
Ed Bacon (disambiguation)